Kilaben Bay is a suburb of the city of Lake Macquarie in the Hunter Region of New South Wales, Australia. The Aboriginal people, in this area, the Awabakal, were the first people of this land. It is named for the bay of the same name that lies to the south of the suburb. The suburb's western boundary is heavily forested. Kilaben Bay is one of many suburbs that ring Lake Macquarie, Lake Munmorah, and Tuggerah Lake. Kilaben Bay is part of the West Ward of the City of Lake Macquarie local government area. For telephone call charges, Kilaben Bay is within the local call zone of the City of Newcastle.

History 
The Aboriginal people, in this area, the Awabakal, were the first people of this land.

Notes

References

External links
 History of Kilaben Bay (Lake Macquarie City Library)
 

Suburbs of Lake Macquarie
Bays of New South Wales